Mount Watkin/Hikaroroa is a 616-metre peak located north-west of Waikouaiti, Otago, New Zealand. It is on the east side of the North Branch of the Waikouaiti River.

The peak was originally named Hikaroroa, after a Kati-Mamoe warrior, and was renamed after a pioneer Methodist missionary, Reverend James Watkin in the 1840s. The name was changed to "Mount Watkin/Hikaroroa" by the Ngai Tahu Claims Settlement Act 1998 No 97.

References

Mountains of Otago
Waikouaiti